Melanie Nathan is a South African-born attorney, a mediator, equality activist, and human rights advocate, who advocates, speaks and writes on issues impacting LGBTI communities around the world, with a focus on the United States and Africa. She immigrated to the U.S. in 1985. She publishes the LGBTI advocacy blog O-Blog-Dee-O-Blog-Da (Life goes on...). She is the executive director of the African Human Rights Coalition (African HRC). She was appointed a community grand marshal for San Francisco Pride 2014, in recognition of her global human rights advocacy work for LGBTI people. She is also a director of the Peacemaker Museum World Tour.

She is co-producing Armagayddon, "a documentary that exposes the historical anti-gay crusades of right-wing movements and their influence on the Republican Party through a critical examination of national figures, social movements, and conservative organizations and think tanks, focusing on the anti-gay rhetoric and policies of the Republican Party, as well as the use of homosexuality as a political weapon and wedge issue."

References

Living people
South African LGBT rights activists
South African women lawyers
South African expatriates in the United States
Year of birth missing (living people)
Place of birth missing (living people)
South African film producers
South African women film producers
Documentary film producers
20th-century South African lawyers
Women documentary filmmakers
20th-century women lawyers